Edgar J. Scherick (October 16, 1924 – December 2, 2002) was an Emmy-winning American television executive and producer of television miniseries, made-for-television films, and theatrical motion pictures.

Life and career 
Scherick was born in New York City, the son of Jennie (née Friedman) and Jacob J. Scherick. He was raised in Long Beach, NY and graduated Long Beach High School in 1941.

Widely credited as a pioneer in network sports broadcasting, Scherick created the television program ABC's Wide World of Sports at his company Sports Programs, Inc. which he started in 1956 with $600.00. In February 1960, Scherick sold Sports Programs to the American Broadcasting Company for $500,000 in ABC stock, where it became ABC Sports, the sports division of the network. With the acquisition, Scherick was appointed head of the ABC Sports division, then Vice President in charge of Network Sales. In June 1963, Scherick became Vice President of Programming for the ABC Television Network, where he created many popular shows including Bewitched, Batman, That Girl, The Hollywood Palace, and Peyton Place.

After his television career, Edgar Scherick became a film and television producer and executive producer of 75 theatrical films, television movies and mini-series through his company Palomar Pictures International and other entities.

In 1983, Scherick had a cameo role as Wilson Crockett, a network television executive, in the Martin Scorsese film, The King of Comedy.

By January 2, 1990, Scherick had gone to work with Saban Entertainment through its Saban/Scherick Productions division, which was for mostly television movies and mini-series He died of complications from leukemia.

Scherick hired and served as a mentor to many famous television and theatrical producers and industry executives including Roone Arledge, Brian Grazer, Scott Rudin, Michael Barnathan, Robert Lawrence and David Nicksay.

Awards and nominations 
Scherick's television body of work includes 6 Emmy nominations and one winning Emmy:
 2002: Outstanding Made For Television Movie – Path To War
 1990: Outstanding Miniseries – The Kennedys of Massachusetts
 1986: Outstanding Miniseries – On Wings of Eagles
 1984: Outstanding Children's Program – He Makes Me Feel Like Dancin' (Winner)
 1983: Outstanding Drama Special – Little Gloria...Happy at Last
 1977: Outstanding Special – Drama or Comedy – Raid on Entebbe The Big Event

Many of the theatrical releases that Scherick produced or credited as Executive Producer were nominated for an Academy Award:
 1968: Best Song (original for the picture) – For Love of Ivy (Quincy Jones, Bob Russell)
 1972: Best Actor – Sleuth (Michael Caine)
 1972: Best Actor – Sleuth (Laurence Olivier)
 1972: Best Director – Sleuth (Joseph L. Mankiewicz)
 1972: Best Original Dramatic Score - Sleuth (John Addison)
 1972: Best Actor in a Supporting Role - The Heartbreak Kid (Eddie Albert)
 1972: Best Actress in a Supporting Role - The Heartbreak Kid (Jeannie Berlin)
 1977: Best Screenplay (based on material from another medium) – I Never Promised You a Rose Garden (Gavin Lambert, Lewis John Carlino)
 1983: Best Documentary - He Makes Me Feel Like Dancin' (Emile Ardolino, Producer)
 1991: Best Actress in a Leading Role - Rambling Rose (Laura Dern)
 1991: Best Actress in a Supporting Role - Rambling Rose (Diane Ladd)

The film "He Makes Me Feel Like Dancin'" is unique as it was for 31 years, the only production to win both an Oscar and an Emmy. Scherick won the Emmy for Outstanding Children's Program as Executive Producer but due to Academy rules, only the credited "Producer" (not Executive Producer) is eligible for a Best Picture Oscar award.

One film that Scherick was credited as Executive Producer, Path to War from 2002' was nominated for the Global Globe Award for Best Television Motion Picture. It was the last film Scherick produced during his lifetime.

In 1997, the Producers Guild of America presented Scherick with their "Norman Lear Achievement Award in Television," recognizing his outstanding body of work and lifetime achievement in this medium.

Scherick also served as chair of the Academy of Television Arts & Sciences' Hall of Fame beginning in 1988.

Select filmography 
He was a producer in all films unless otherwise noted.

Film 

As an actor

Miscellaneous crew

Television 

As an actor

As writer

Miscellaneous crew

References

External links 

Luke Ford: Profiles: Edgar Scherick
The Archive of American Television: Interview with Edgar Scherick (90 minutes)

1924 births
2002 deaths
American film producers
American television executives
American television producers
Harvard Business School alumni
Wide World of Sports (American TV series)
American Broadcasting Company executives
American Broadcasting Company Vice Presidents of Programs
American people of German descent
Long Beach High School (New York) alumni